The Bad Life (Spanish: La Mala vida) is a 1973 Argentine crime film directed by Hugo Fregonese.

Partial cast
 Hugo del Carril as Víctor, The French 
 Soledad Silveyra
 Víctor Laplace  
 Ignacio Quirós    
 Tito Alonso   
 Idelma Carlo   
 María Vaner    
 Jorge Rivera López 
 Héctor Méndez   
 María Rosa Gallo   
 Adrian Ghio   
 Iván Grondona   
 Guillermo Macro  
 Ricardo Bouzas
 Elizabeth Makar  
 José María Fra    
 Alberto Segado   
 Hugo Mújica

References

Bibliography 
 Rist, Peter H. Historical Dictionary of South American Cinema. Rowman & Littlefield, 2014.

External links

1973 films
1973 crime films
Argentine crime films
1970s Spanish-language films
Films directed by Hugo Fregonese
1970s Argentine films